This article is about the demographic features of the population of the Cocos (Keeling) Islands, including population density, ethnicity, education level, health of the populace, economic status, religious affiliations and other aspects of the population.

CIA World Factbook demographic statistics 
The following demographic statistics are from the CIA World Factbook, unless otherwise indicated.

Population
596

Nationality
noun: Cocos Islander(s)
adjective: Cocos Islander

Ethnic groups
Europeans
Cocos Malays

Religions
Sunni Islam 80%
Other 20%

Languages
Malay (Cocos dialect)
English

See also
 Cocos (Keeling) Islands
 Cocos Malays

References

 
Cocos (Keeling) Islands